Soul Quest (stylized as SOUL QUEST) is the tenth studio album by Japanese singer Misia. It was released on July 27, 2011, through Ariola Japan. The album yielded three official singles, the digital exclusives "Edge of This World" and "Life in Harmony", and the sole physical release "Kioku". The lead track, "This Is Me", served as promotional single for the album.

Background and release
Misia stated in an interview with EMTG Music that the theme for the album was "modern soul". She wanted to take a departure from the ballad-heavy sound of Just Ballade to concentrate on creating an R&B record. Misia cites soul records from past decades as her inspiration, describing a desire to incorporate soulful melodies with a contemporary digital sound to create a fusion.

Soul Quest is Misia's first studio album in over a year and a half. It was released in two distinct formats, one standard edition and a limited two-disc edition featuring a 77-minute non-stop DJ mix of various fan favorite songs, produced by Muro. The album was supported by The Tour of Misia Japan Soul Quest, which started prior to the album's release in February 2011 and was extended through February 2012.

Several songs off the album received commercial tie-ins: "Subarashī Mono o Sagashi ni Ikō" and "Manatsu no Chameleon" were both featured on the AX variety show Himitsu no Kenmin Show, while "Ame no Sonata" was used in H&S commercials, and "Kimi ni wa Uso o Tsukenai" in commercials for the retail forex trading firm Gaitame Japan.

Commercial performance
Soul Quest entered the daily Oricon Albums Chart at number 4, where it also peaked. It debuted at number 7 on the weekly Oricon Albums Chart, with sales of 20,000 copies. The album debuted one position higher, at number 6, on the Billboard Japan Top Albums Sales chart. Soul Quest charted for fifteen weeks on the Oricon Albums Chart, selling a reported total of 40,000 copies during its run.

Track listing

Charts

Sales

References

External links
 Soul Quest Special Site

2011 albums
Misia albums
Ariola Japan albums
Albums produced by David Foster
Albums produced by DJ Gomi
Albums produced by Shirō Sagisu